Boyat (also, Boyad and Bayat) is a village and municipality in the Aghjabadi Rayon of Azerbaijan with a population of 1,662.

References 

Populated places in Aghjabadi District